Nuestra Belleza Nuevo León 2004, was held at Las Lomas Eventos in Monterrey, Nuevo León on July 6, 2004. At the conclusion of the final night of competition Ana Paola De la Parra of San Pedro Garza García was crowned the winner. De la Parra was crowned by outgoing Nuestra Belleza Nuevo León titleholder Alejandra Villanueva. Nine contestants competed for the title.

Results

Placements

Background Music
Jose Cantoral
 Francisco Cespedes

Contestants

References

External links
Official Website

Nuestra Belleza México